The Flashman Papers is a series of novels and short stories written by George MacDonald Fraser, the first of which was published in 1969. The books centre on the exploits of the fictional protagonist Harry Flashman. He is a cowardly British soldier, rake and cad who is placed in a series of real historical incidents between 1839 and 1894. While the incidents and much of the detail in the novels have a factual background, Flashman's actions in the stories are either fictional, or Fraser uses the actions of unidentified individuals and assigns them to Flashman. Flashman is a character in the 1857 novel by Thomas Hughes, Tom Brown's School Days; Hughes' version of the character is a bully at Rugby School who is expelled for drunkenness. The character was then developed by Fraser, and appeared in the 1969 novel Flashman. Fraser went on to write a total of eleven novels and one collection of short stories featuring the character.

During the course of Fraser's novels, Flashman goes from his expulsion from school into the army. Although he is a coward who tries to run away from any danger, he is involved in many famous military episodes from the 19th century, often taking actions that cause or affect subsequent events, such as his flatulence affecting the Charge of the Light Brigade, or being the person who probably shot George Armstrong Custer. When circumstances run against him and he is forced to fight, he often does so bravely and capably. Despite his cowardice and his attempts to flee, he becomes a decorated war hero and rises to the rank of brigadier-general. He also meets people who either were notable at the time—such as Benjamin Disraeli and the Duke of Wellington—or who became well known after Flashman met them—such as Abraham Lincoln. Flashman either has, or tries to have, sex with most of the female characters: by the end of the ninth book he estimates that he has had sex with 480 women.

The publication sequence of the books differs from the fictional chronology, with the time frame of some books overlapping. One of the novels, Flashman and the Redskins, is in two parts: part one takes place in 1849–50, while the second covers 1875–76. Although the main series of stories finishes in 1894, Flashman lives on until 1915 and appears in his late 80s in another Fraser novel, Mr American.

Context

The series consists of twelve historical fiction books written by the journalist, author and screenwriter George MacDonald Fraser, that were published between 1969 and 2005. The series consists of eleven novels and one collection of short stories, spanning from 1839 to 1894; they are the memoirs of the fictional character General Sir Harry Paget Flashman, VC, KCB, KCIE. Although Flashman is fictional, the settings and history of the events, and the people with whom he interacts are all largely based around historical events and individuals, although three contain elements of other novels. Flashman first appeared in the 1857 semi-autobiographical novel Tom Brown's School Days by Thomas Hughes as a bully at Rugby School, who persecutes Tom Brown, and who is expelled for drunkenness: Fraser's series of novels starts with Flashman's expulsion from school. Based on a literary conceit, an explanatory note—itself also fictional—at the start of Flashman sets the context and explains that the memoirs had been found in an auction house in Ashby, Leicestershire, and had subsequently come into the possession of Fraser, who has acted in the role of editor. Fraser also included pages of notes and appendices at the end of each volume, providing the factual background for Flashman's endeavours.

Fraser was working as a journalist on The Glasgow Herald when he wrote the first novel, Flashman; writing in the evenings, after work, he took 90 hours in total to write the story. After the book was published, he left journalism and took up writing novels. When a break from writing was forced upon him by a broken arm, he abandoned the book until his wife read the manuscript and urged him to finish. He did not find a publisher for the novel for two years, until Barrie & Jenkins published it in 1969. When the novel was published in the US the same year, of the 34 reviews read by Alden Whitman of The New York Times, ten of them considered the book to be a genuine autobiography. Fraser researched each novel at Trinity College Dublin. From their first publication, the books were a commercial success, and new editions appeared on the best-sellers' lists.

Flashman

Flashman is from a semi-aristocratic background; he recounted that his great-grandfather "made a fortune in America out of slaves and rum, and piracy, too, I shouldn't wonder". His father was "a dissolute former MP, living beyond the bounds of respectable society, and ... his mother [was] born of the self-promoting Paget family". Despite joining the army after expulsion from school, Flashman is a self-confessed coward with a false reputation for bravery, earned at the expense of others, and despite him trying to avoid danger at all costs. He is also "a scoundrel, a drunk, a liar, a cheat [and] a braggart", who was described by Fraser as "an unrepentant old cad" whose only positive features are "humour and shameless honesty as a memorialist".

He was forced into marriage in the first book, after he "caddishly deflowered" Elspeth Morrison, the daughter of a wealthy Scottish textile manufacturer with whom he had been billeted. Despite being married—and the fact he deeply loves his wife—Flashman is "a compulsive womaniser" who has bedded 480 women by the tenth book in the series, which was set in 1859. Elspeth is also probably unfaithful to him on several occasions. Flashman notes that he has three "prime talents, for horses, languages, and fornication"; he was also described by the master-at-arms of the 11th Hussars as a strong swordsman and was skilled with a lance, particularly at tent pegging. When it is necessary for him to control his fear, he will perform bravely, although is more adept at saving his own skin at the expense of others.

In the course of the series, Flashman is promoted to the rank of brigadier-general, and decorated numerous times by different countries. While the books cover some of the awards—such as being given the Victoria Cross for his actions during the sieges of Cawnpore and Lucknow—some stories are not known, such as how and why he served on both sides of the American Civil War and how he won the Medal of Honor.

During his travels Flashman meets people who took part in 19th-century events, including Queen Victoria, Abraham Lincoln, Otto von Bismarck, Oscar Wilde and Florence Nightingale, and he is involved as a participant in some of the century's most notable events, including the Indian Rebellion, the Taiping Rebellion, the charge of the Light Brigade, the Siege of Khartoum, John Brown's raid on Harpers Ferry and the Battle of the Little Bighorn.

Flashman died in 1915, although the details are unknown.

Publication sequence

Fictional chronology

Other references

Flashman also appears in another book by Fraser, Mr American, age 88, while his father was one of the financial backers of the bare-knuckle boxer Tom Molineaux in Black Ajax.

Notes and references 
Notes

References

Bibliography

External links

Flashman novels
Historical novels by series
Novels about the Great Game